This is a list of chancellors of Germany by time in office from 1867 to 2021, including the Federal Republic of Germany and its predecessors. This is based on the difference between dates; if counted by number of calendar days all the figures would be one greater. Bismarck's successive tenure as Chancellor of the North German Confederation (1867–1871) and of the German Empire (1871–1890) is counted as one continuous term; Müller and Marx's double terms are treated as single, continuous tenures.

See also
 List of German monarchs
 President of Germany
 List of German presidents
 President of Germany (1919–1945)
 Chancellor of Germany
 Chancellor of Germany (Federal Republic)
 Leadership of East Germany
 List of chancellors of Germany

 
Germany, Chancellors
Chancellors